St Georges Strand is a coastal village located in the Eastern Cape, South Africa and is ~20 kilometres north of Port Elizabeth.

Geography 
St Georges Strand is on Algoa Bay surrounded by the Coega Industrial Development Zone (which includes the deepwater port, Port of Ngqura) in the north, Wells Estate in the west and Bluewater Bay in the south.

St Georges Strand is one of Port Elizabeth's northernmost suburbs.

Beach 
The beach at St Georges Strand is Port Elizabeth's northernmost beach. Swimming at the beach is not advised due to violent waters and waves. This is the reason why the beach is not very often frequented by locals or is known very well in the Port Elizabeth area. However lifeguards are on duty during the peak/summer holiday season.

Road Access 
St Georges Strand is situated east of the N2 highway and the Exit 761 off-ramp. King George's Avenue connects the village to the N2 and the R335.

The N2 highway connects to the city of Port Elizabeth and Humansdorp to the south and Makhanda and East London to the north. 

The R335 connects to Motherwell, Wells Estate, Markman and Addo.

References 

Populated places in Nelson Mandela Bay